Christopher Joshi Hansen (born Christopher Craig Hansen; June 16, 1975) is an American politician who serves in the Colorado Senate from the 31st as a member of the Democratic Party since 2020. Prior to his service in the state senate he served in the Colorado House of Representatives from the 6th district from 2017 to 2020.

Hansen was born in Lincoln, Nebraska, and raised in Goodland, Kansas. He graduated from Kansas State University, University of the Witwatersrand, Massachusetts Institute of Technology, and Linacre College, Oxford. He started working at Cambridge Energy Research Associates in 2005.

He was elected to the state house in the 2016 election and was reelected in the 2018 election. During his tenure in the state house he served as the chair of the Appropriations committee. A vacancy committee selected him to replace Lois Court in the state senate in 2020, and was elected in the following election.

Early life and education

Christopher Craig Hansen was born in Lincoln, Nebraska, on June 16, 1975, to Lana and Wallace Hansen. He met Ulcca Shashee Joshi in 1998, married her on July 28, 2001, and had two children with her. Hansen later changed his middle name to Joshi.

He graduated from high school in Goodland, Kansas in 1993, from Kansas State University with a Bachelor of Science in nuclear engineering in 1998, from Massachusetts Institute of Technology with a Master of Science in technology policy in 2003, and from Linacre College, Oxford with a doctorate in economic geography in 2009. He also received a graduate diploma in civil engineering from the University of the Witwatersrand. Hansen served as president of the student body at Kansas State University from 1996 to 1997 after being elected with 57% of the vote and also served as president of the Theta Xi chapter. He started working at Cambridge Energy Research Associates in 2005.

Colorado Legislature

Elections

Hansen ran for a seat in the Colorado House of Representatives from the 6th district in the 2016 election. His opponent Jeff Hart sent out campaign advertisements falsely accusing Hansen of being supported by the National Rifle Association and later apologized for it. Hansen accused Hart of being under investigation by the Denver district attorney for violating misinformation laws, but the district attorney told Hansen to retract his statement for violating misinformation laws. He defeated Hart in the Democratic primary and won in the general election without opposition. He was reelected in the 2018 election without opposition.

Hansen announced on October 2, 2019, that he would run to succeed Court in the state senate in the 2020 election. Court received a diagnosis of Guillain–Barré syndrome on December 31, and resigned on January 16, 2020. Attorney General Phil Weiser nominated Hansen to replace court at the vacancy committee vote and Representative Janet Buckner seconded his nomination. Ninety-five of the one hundred twenty vacancy committee members voted for him against four other candidates on January 16, and he was sworn in on January 21. A vacancy committee voted to appoint Steven Woodrow to replace Hansen in the state house on February 4.

He defeated Maria E. Orms for the Democratic nomination and won in the general election against Republican nominee Doug Townsend. Hansen and Senator Robert Rodriguez were drawn into the 22nd district following reapportionment for the 2022 election.

Tenure

During Hansen's tenure in the state house he served as the chair of the Appropriations committee and on the Joint Budget committee. During his tenure in the state senate he has served on the Appropriations, Finance, and State, Veterans, and Military Affairs committees. He also replaced Senator Rachel Zenzinger on the Joint Budget committee before Zenzinger returned to the committee by replacing Dominick Moreno.

He is considering running in the 2023 Denver mayoral election.

Political positions

Hansen sponsored legislation to change the name of Columbus Day to be in honor of Frances Xavier Cabrini. He and Representative Dafna Michaelson Jenet sponsored a resolution criticizing President Donald Trump's travel ban. He support legislation to end capital punishment in Colorado. He was one of the signatories of a letter sent to Representatives Lauren Boebert and Doug Lamborn calling for them to resign for inciting the 2021 United States Capitol attack.

The Colorado Sierra Club awarded Hansen as the state legislator of the year for 2019. He received an A rating from NARAL Pro-Choice America and was endorsed by the organization in the 2018 election. He received a 100% rating from the American Civil Liberties Union in 2017, 2018, and 2019.

Electoral history

References

1975 births
Living people
Democratic Party members of the Colorado House of Representatives
Democratic Party Colorado state senators
Politicians from Denver
Alumni of the University of Oxford
Massachusetts Institute of Technology alumni
Kansas State University alumni
21st-century American politicians